The Battle of Lođa was fought during the Kosovo War in the village of Lođa first on  6-12 July 1998 and again later on 10-17 August 1998. between the Yugoslav Army against the Kosovo Liberation Army (KLA) and Armed Forces of the Republic of Kosova (FARK). The first battle was an operation launched to counterattack the Albanian rebels after two Yugoslav policemen patrolling the area had been killed. The first battle ended in an KLA victory, while the second operation ended in a Yugoslav victory. All of village's 284 houses and mosque were destroyed by Serbian Police with bulldozers.

References

Military operations of the Kosovo War
Lođa
1998 in Kosovo
Lođa
Peja
Kosovo Liberation Army
July 1998 events in Europe
August 1998 events in Europe
Anti-Albanian sentiment